The 125th Street station was an express station on the demolished IRT Second Avenue Line in Manhattan, New York City. It had three tracks and two island platforms. The next stop to the north was 129th Street for terminating trains and 133rd Street for through trains. The next stop to the south was 121st Street for local trains and 86th Street for express trains. The station closed on June 11, 1940.

References

External links
 

http://www.nycsubway.org/perl/caption.pl?/img/maps/calcagno-1920-elevated.gif

IRT Second Avenue Line stations
Railway stations closed in 1940
Former elevated and subway stations in Manhattan
1940 disestablishments in New York (state)